In knot theory, a branch of mathematics, a knot or link 

Examples

Knots that are fibered
For example:

 The unknot, trefoil knot, and figure-eight knot are fibered knots.
 The Hopf link is a fibered link.

Knots that are not fibered

The Alexander polynomial of a fibered knot is  monic, i.e. the coefficients of the highest and lowest powers of t are plus or minus 1. Examples of knots with nonmonic Alexander polynomials abound, for example the twist knots have Alexander polynomials , where q is the number of half-twists. In particular the stevedore knot is not fibered.

Related constructions
Fibered knots and links arise naturally, but not exclusively, in complex algebraic geometry.  For instance, each singular point of a complex plane curve can be described 
topologically as the cone on a fibered knot or link called the link of the singularity.  The trefoil knot is the link of the cusp singularity ; the Hopf link (oriented correctly) is the link of the node singularity .  In these cases, the family of Seifert surfaces is an aspect of the Milnor fibration of the singularity.

See also
(−2,3,7) pretzel knot

References

External links